José Enrique Manica Grajales (born March 27, 1993, in Veracruz City, Veracruz) is a Mexican professional footballer who plays as a defender for Ascenso MX club Potros UAEM.

References

1993 births
Living people
Mexican footballers
Mexican people of Italian descent
Association football defenders
Albinegros de Orizaba footballers
Potros UAEM footballers
Ascenso MX players
Liga Premier de México players
Tercera División de México players
People from Veracruz (city)
Footballers from Veracruz